Ragnar Alfred Bertil Carlsson (25 August 1903 – 26 November 1953) was a Swedish ski jumper who won a bronze medal in the individual large hill at the 1927 World Championships. Next year he finished tenth in the normal hill at the 1928 Winter Olympics.

References

External links
 
 

1903 births
1953 deaths
Swedish male ski jumpers
Ski jumpers at the 1928 Winter Olympics
FIS Nordic World Ski Championships medalists in ski jumping
Olympic ski jumpers of Sweden